Seo Ji-seok (born Seo Jong-wook, 9 September 1981) is a South Korean actor. He is best known for playing in the long-running TV series, notably in the 167-episode KBS1 daily drama Pure in Heart (Pure 19), which brought him to win Best New Actor at the 2006 KBS Drama Awards.

Early life and education 
Seo was an athlete specializing in 100 metres and 200 metres sprint in middle school. He won four gold medals in a variety of sports when he was 16 years old and was also chosen to be the member of the national team. However, in 1999, he was hit by a vehicle while he was crossing the street, and was hospitalized for 6 months. He was then scouted on the street, while working part-time, by a talent manager who liked his refined appearance, henceforth choosing acting as his career. Seo graduated from Seoul Institute of the Arts, majoring in Bachelor of Film and Television.

Career 
Seo has appeared in two films directed by renowned South Korean movie director Kim Ki-duk. In Kim's 2005 film The Bow, he played a college student involved in a mysterious and dangerous relationship between an old man and a 16-year-old girl.

Seo appeared for the second time in Kim's movie Time as a guest star, and participated in the film May I Cry? in 2006. That same year, Seo was cast as the smart and cold Park Yoon-hoo in the 167-episode daily drama Pure in Heart, leading the series alongside Ku Hye-sun. For his performance in the series, he won Best New Actor award at the 2006 KBS Drama Awards.

In 2007, Seo reported for his mandatory military service and was assigned to the 12th Infantry Division located in Inje, Gangwon-do. He was discharged on May 3, 2009, and subsequently held a fan meeting on May 10, 2009. Seo returned to acting by playing in an independent film The Inside Story of Him and Her and appearing as a cameo in High Kick Through The Roof.

In 2010, Seo was cast as a lead role in the series OB & GY, followed by weekend drama Gloria opposite Bae Doo-na. He next joined a variety show Sunday Night for six months as one of the MCs.

In 2011, Seo starred in the 16-episode romantic-comedy drama Manny. He also starred in High Kick Through The Roof'''s spin-off; a 123-episode sitcom High Kick: Revenge of the Short Legged. In addition to acting, Seo also appeared in figure skater Kim Yuna's variety show Kim Yuna's Kiss & Cry.

In 2012, Seo participated in the 3-episode of MBC Music cable TV variety program Music and Lyrics Season 2 with composer Kim Wi Yong, actress Lee Chung-ah, and singer Heo Young-saeng to collaborate on OST "Gazing (바라본다)" for MBC's weekend drama The Sons. The following year, Seo played as a lead actor in the film Mango Tree, a cameo in the series Potato Star 2013QR3, and also starred in the 50-episode weekend drama A Little Love Never Hurts from 2013 to 2014.

From 2013 to 2015, Seo appeared in two long-running variety programs; Cool Kiz on the Block, and Law of the Jungle which was shot in Costa Rica. He returned to daily dramas, playing in the 120-episode The Three Witches (Witch Castle) in 2015, followed by 100-episode Unknown Woman in 2017.

In July 2019, Seo replaced Kang Ji-hwan in a period drama Joseon Survival Period'', starting from episode 11 to 16.

In october 2021 Seo has signed with Management Redwoods.

Personal life
Seo married a florist in 2013. Singer IU and R&B group 4Men sang celebratory songs in their wedding.

Filmography

Film

Television series

Music video appearance

Variety shows

Theater

Awards and nominations

References

External links 
  at The Great Company 크다컴퍼니 (Joined in 2017) 
 Seo Jisuk Japan Official Site (ソ・ジソク ジャパンオフィシャルサイト)
 Official Fan Club - Daum Café Tasanjisuk  (타산지석, 他山之石)
 

South Korean male film actors
South Korean male television actors
South Korean television personalities
Seoul Institute of the Arts alumni
Male actors from Seoul
1981 births
Living people